Acadie station is a Montreal Metro in Montreal, Quebec, Canada in the borough of Villeray–Saint-Michel–Parc-Extension (on the border with the town of Mount Royal, Quebec). It is operated by the Société de transport de Montréal (STM) and serves the Blue Line. It is located in the Parc-Extension.

Overview  
It is a normal side platform station. Two entrances on either side of boul. de l'Acadie lead to a common ticket hall. The station platform is decorated in bold colours such as blue, hot pink, black, and slate grey. The ticket hall is host to a tall clock and bench ensemble entitled Lieu de rendez-vous by Météore Design and the seating is by sculptor Michel Morelli. A series of whimsical photographic works by Jean Mercier showing people turning cartwheels and mid-air somersaults adorns the walls of the stairwell and passages to the exits.

Origin of name 
Acadie station was named for the Boulevard de l'Acadie (English: Acadie Boulevard), in turn named to remember Acadia, the site of the first permanent french settlement in North America.

Connecting bus routes

Nearby points of interest 
 Centre commercial Place l'Acadie-Beaumont
 Clinique René-Laennec
 Université de Montréal - Campus MIL
 Centre Rockland

References

External links 

 Acadie station on STM website
 Montreal by Metro, metrodemontreal.com

Blue Line (Montreal Metro)
Villeray–Saint-Michel–Parc-Extension
Railway stations in Canada opened in 1988
Mount Royal, Quebec